The Order of Kantakuzina Katarina Branković is an honor given by the Metropolitanate of Zagreb and Ljubljana in recognition of special merits to the Serbian Orthodox Church in Croatia, Slovenia and Italy. The award was established in 2007 on the occasion of the celebration of the thirtieth anniversary of the enthronement of Metropolitan Jovan Pavlović of Zagreb. For this occasion the Metropolitanate commissioned a special limited edition collection of medals and diplomas that are made at the Monastery of St. Roman in South Serbia close to the city of Niš. It was decided that the medal will be named for the Orthodox Countess Kantakuzina Katarina Branković who lived in Zagreb in the 15th century.

Description

The award consists of a forged medal, diploma and order certificate. The award can be awarded to individuals for special merits according to pronouncement of Metropolit Jovan. The order is divided into Medal of Kantakuzina Katarina Branković of first-order and Medal of Kantakuzina Katarina Branković of second-order.

Order holders
list of holders is not complete

First Order
Vasilije, Serbian Orthodox bishop of Srem
Archbishop Sergei of Samara
Drazen Juračić, architect)
Jelena Skorup Juračić, architect)
Nataša Ćećez Sekulić
Snežana Opačić
Mira Bićanić
Gvido Di Antoni
Snežana Petrović
priest Draško Todorović
priest Dušan Kolundžić

Second Order
Abbess Varvara from Tolski monastery in Russia
Vladimir Aleksandrovič Koveljev sponsor of Tolski monastery in Russia
Aleksandar Sergejevič Kotov 
Abbot Seraphim Glušakov from Samara 
Abbot Ivan Salnikov from Samara
Bojana Đerić
Danilo Jelić
Dario Pavlović
Dragana Patković
Dušan Tadić
Hristina Radmilović
Jelena Jelić
Jelena Lalić
Jelena Šimpraga
Marinko Repac
Maša Samardžija
Milica Mijatović
Milan Uzelac
Milica Bradaš
Milorad Subašić
Miloš Vlaisavljević
Mirjana Šamara
Mirko Savković
Nikola Bradaš
Nikola Malešević
Sanja Tepšić
Slađana Radoš
Tatjana Dragičević
Tea Kaurin
Vasko Tišma
Zorica Kukavica
Željana Modrinić
Olga Jovanović-Milić
Milica Vračarević
Đorđe Sekulić
Božica Vasić
Živislavka Cvetković
Dušica Miladinović
Anđelka Vuković
Dušanka Đorđević
Olga Kostić
Božidarka Jevtić
Živanka Jovanović

See also
 Metropolitanate of Zagreb and Ljubljana
 Serbs of Croatia
 List of ecclesiastical decorations

References

External links
Pokrajine

https://web.archive.org/web/20120322081911/http://pravoslavlje.spc.rs/broj/959/tekst/nedelja-pravoslavlja-u-srpskoj-crkvi/print/lat
https://web.archive.org/web/20120326022503/http://www.stajerska.eu/arhiv2010/index.php?option=com_content&view=article&id=106:the-new-gymnasium-for-the-serbs-in-zagreb&Itemid=1
Osveštan kamen temeljac zagrebačke Srpske pravoslavne gimnazije
::: C R K V A ::: : Orden Kantakuzina Katarina
NEDJELJA PRAVOSLAVLJA U TRSTU
Janša položio kamen temeljac za centar SPC u Ljubljani
Analiza :: Crkva i nagradjuje - VIA

Awards established in 2007
Eastern Orthodox ecclesiastical decorations
History of the Serbs of Croatia
Serbian Orthodox Church in Croatia
2007 establishments in Croatia
Metropolitanate of Zagreb and Ljubljana